Frigid Stars LP is the debut album by American indie rock band Codeine. It was released in August 1990 on Glitterhouse in Europe and in Spring 1991 on Sub Pop in the US. The album was released to generally positive reviews and is regarded as being one of the pioneering albums in the slowcore and sadcore genres. It was chosen by Pitchfork in 2008 as one of the 20 best Sub Pop albums.

"New Year's" is a cover version of a track co-written by Bitch Magnet singer Sooyoung Park. Park did not record the track himself until 1992, with new band Seam. Park is featured on the song "Summer Dresses", which can be found on the 2012 expanded re-issue by the label The Numero Group. This edition also placed "3 Angels" to the fourth track on the album. "Cave-In" has been covered by rock band Cave In and appears on their compilation album Anomalies, Vol. 1. The song title was the inspiration for their band name.

The phrase "frigid stars" is taken from a line in the song "Crap Rap 2" by The Fall from their 1979 album Live at the Witch Trials.

Track listing

Personnel
Codeine
 Chris Brokaw – drums, guitar
 John Engle – guitar
 Stephen Immerwahr – bass guitar, vocals, all instruments on demo versions of "Pea", "Second Chance", "Pickup Song", "Cave-In", and "Kitchen"

Additional personnel
 Mike McMackin – piano on "Pea"
 Peter Pollack - drums on "Castle", "Skeletons", and "3 Angels"
 Sooyoung Park - bass on demo version of "Summer Dresses"

Production
Mike McMackin - production, recording
Laura Larson - photography
Tammi Colichio - cover art

References

External links
 

Codeine (band) albums
Sub Pop albums
1990 debut albums